Malafeh (also Romanized as Molfeh; also known as Chohesan) is a village in Sharq va Gharb-e Shirgah Rural District, North Savadkuh County, Mazandaran Province, Iran. At the 2006 census, its population was 936, in 264 families.

References 

Populated places in Savadkuh County